Mikael Jalving (born 1 October 1968) is a Danish journalist, historian, author and political commentator. Jalving worked as a commentator for Berlingske Tidende and wrote as the newspaper's most widely read blogger, until 2009 when he was hired by Jyllands-Posten. He has a Ph.D. in history from the European University Institute in Florence.

Jalving has described himself as politically being national-liberal, social conservative, and more right-wing than all parties represented in the Folketing. He caught attention in Sweden in 2011 for his book Absolut Sverige, which according to Dagens Nyheter describes a land of "self-righteous Swedes, treacherously lulled into a social democratic dystopia of control and political correctness". The book was partly a response to a book by Swedish journalist Lena Sundström that criticised Danish attitudes towards immigration.

During the month of July 2014, Jalving hosted a limited daily radio show called Danmarks Röst ("Voice of Denmark", inspired by Cold War-era Voice of America), which aimed to transmit debate to Swedish listeners about subjects perceived to be taboo in Swedish public debate.

Jalving was criticised by an Islam researcher at the University of Copenhagen for misinforming about a muslims' replies about 'sharia' in a questionnaire that did not mention sharia, but rules in the Quran, while sharia are based on other texts.

Bibliography
 Søren Krarup og hans tid (2014)
 Absolut Sverige: En rejse i tavshedens rige (2011)
 Magt og ret. Et opgør med Godheden (2007)
 Utopiske Europa. Artikler om historiens nutid (1998)
 Mellem linierne. Thorkild Hansens historieskrivning (1994)

References

1968 births
Living people
People from Aarhus
European University Institute alumni
20th-century Danish male writers
21st-century Danish male writers
20th-century Danish non-fiction writers
21st-century Danish non-fiction writers
20th-century Danish historians
21st-century Danish historians
20th-century Danish journalists
21st-century Danish journalists
Berlingske people
Jyllands-Posten people
Male non-fiction writers